The women's coxless pair rowing event at the 2011 Pan American Games will be held from October 15–17 at the Canoe & Rowing Course in Ciudad Guzman. The defending Pan American Games champion is María José Orellana & Soraya Jadue of Chile.

Schedule
All times are Central Standard Time (UTC-6).

Results

Heat 1

Final A

References

Women's rowing at the 2011 Pan American Games